Peter Lawler may refer to:

Peter Lawler (academic) (1951–2017), professor of political philosophy and American politics
Peter Lawler (canoeist) (born 1941), British sprint canoer
Peter Lawler (public servant) (1921–2017), Australian public servant and diplomat